Mapidima "Bally" Smart (born 27 April 1989 in Polokwane, Limpopo) is a South African footballer, who last played as a winger or striker for Skonto Riga in the Latvian Higher League. Smart owns Polokwane United FC in the SAFA Second Division.

Early career

Smart attended Thorpe St Andrew High School in Norwich where he studied for his GCSEs prior to joining Norwich City in 2005. He made his first team debut as a substitute against Burnley on 17 April 2007, and signed his first professional contract lasting one year on 12 May 2007.

After impressing for Norwich Reserves in a 2-1 away victory against the MK Dons, Dons manager Paul Ince decided that Smart could add extra competition for places on the wing and signed him on a three-month loan.

Bally Smart joined Greek club Kerkyra FC in August 2008 when his contract with Norwich City ended.

Charlton Athletic

Just 24 hours before Charlton's first match of 2010–11 season, they signed Smart on a non-contract basis and he was an unused substitute for the club's opener against AFC Bournemouth. He made his debut three days later as the Addicks let a 3–0 lead slip in the League Cup at Shrewsbury Town to lose 4–3.

Skonto Riga

In March 2011 Smart joined Latvian champions Skonto Riga. He made his league debut against FB Gulbene-2005 on 10 April 2011. He left the team after the season with 8 league games under his belt.

Polokwane United

After his return from Latvia in 2012, Smart established Polokwane United Academy in his home town. His academy senior team competes in the South African Third Division (4th Tier) called the SAB Regional League.

International career

He played seven matches for the South Africa national under-20 football team, including winning the 2008 COSAFA U-20 Cup.

Honours
 Cosafa Under 20 Championship: 2008
 TrioBet Baltic League Cup: 2011

References

External links

1989 births
Living people
English Football League players
Association football midfielders
South African soccer players
Norwich City F.C. players
Milton Keynes Dons F.C. players
A.O. Kerkyra players
Charlton Athletic F.C. players
Expatriate footballers in Greece
Skonto FC players
Expatriate footballers in Latvia